2 & 2A Well Street, Ruthin is a Grade II listed building in the community of Ruthin, Denbighshire, Wales, which dates back to at least the 19th century, with most parts rebuilt in 1904. It was listed by Cadw (Reference Number 901) on 24 October 1950.

Now trading as the "Celtic Hair Studio" at 2 Well Street, the site was originally for a  public house built (the 'Ruth Inn') in 1401, possibly the oldest pub in Ruthin. It ceased trading in 1773. In 1850 the building was transformed into a draper's, later becoming the town post office until 1904.

Today's post office in St Peter's Square is reputed to be on the site of the  medieval Carmelite Priory of White Friars said to be founded and built by Reginald de Grey and was partly destroyed by the Reformation of Churches. De Grey also provided a large piece of land close to the castle known as Whitefriars. A horse feed chandler's stood next to the public house; both buildings were destroyed by fire in 1904 when the present post office was built to replace this one.

Location
This building is fronting Castle Street, almost opposite its junction with Dog Lane.

Notes 

Grade II listed buildings in Ruthin